José Bañales Castro (born 13 February 1960) is a Mexican politician from the Party of the Democratic Revolution. From 2000 to 2003 he served as Deputy of the LVIII Legislature of the Mexican Congress representing Jalisco.

References

1960 births
Living people
Politicians from Jalisco
Party of the Democratic Revolution politicians
21st-century Mexican politicians
Deputies of the LVIII Legislature of Mexico
Members of the Chamber of Deputies (Mexico) for Jalisco